Syracuse Pulse, initially AC Syracuse Pulse is an American professional soccer club based in Syracuse, New York. The Pulse field a men's team in the National Independent Soccer Association (NISA), the 3rd tier of the US soccer pyramid, and a women's side in United Women's Soccer (UWS). The team was established in 2021 and began league play in 2022.

History
In May 2021, an ownership group led by business man Samir Belhseine announced an application to join the National Independent Soccer Association for 2022. The team, initially just called AC Syracuse, announced plans to develop an academy system along with a women's soccer team that would compete in United Women's Soccer. The team also announced a fan-vote for the community to pick the club mascot, with the top 32 names at the end of the voting submission window entered into a bracket and a winner announced at the New York State Fair.

On October 26, the team was officially accepted into NISA after being approved by the league's Board of Governors. The team, now known as AC Syracuse Pulse, also announced its new team nickname and logo the same day in a local press conference. Former C.F. União assistant manager and Cayman Islands youth national team manager Cláudio Garcia was announced as the first-ever team manager.

On December 10, UWS announced the Pulse's acceptances into the league for 2022. Syracuse native and former UWS player Brooke Barbuto was also announced as the team's first head coach.

Ground
AC Syracuse Pulse plays their home games at Lazer Stadium on the campus of Onondaga Community College in Syracuse, New York.

Moroccan Academy
Ahead of its inaugural team management from The Pulse and NISA visited Morocco, Belhseine's home country, in November 2021 on a humanitarian mission. In a joint press conference the team announced a partnership with the city of Laayoune to open an academy to promote and develop football in the Sahara region.

Players

Current roster

References

National Independent Soccer Association teams
United Women's Soccer teams
Soccer in Syracuse, New York
Men's soccer clubs in New York (state)
Women's soccer clubs in New York (state)
AC Syracuse Pulse
2021 establishments in New York (state)
Association football clubs established in 2021